When Fallen Angels Fly is the seventh studio album by American country music artist Patty Loveless, released on August 23, 1994. It reached #8 on the Top Country Albums charts and was certified Platinum for shipments of over 1,000,000 copies in the U.S. All four of its singles — "I Try to Think About Elvis," "You Don't Even Know Who I Am," "Here I Am," and "Halfway Down" — reached the Top Ten on the Hot Country Songs charts. "Old Weakness (Coming on Strong)" was also recorded by Greg Holland on his 1997 album Exception to the Rule and Delbert McClinton on his 1997 album One of the Fortunate Few. Both "Old Weakness" and "Over My Shoulder" were also recorded in 2002 by Tanya Tucker on her album Tanya.

When Fallen Angels Fly won the Country Music Association Award for Album of the Year in 1995, Loveless was only the third woman in the history of the CMA Awards to win.

Track listing

Personnel
Technical
 Emory Gordy Jr.: Producer
 Mixed By Derek Bason & John Guess
 Engineered By Bob Bullock, Amy Hughes, Craig White & Marty Williams
 Mastered By Glenn Meadows
Musicians

 Eddy Anderson – percussion
 Richard Bennett – acoustic guitar, electric guitar
 Kathy Burdick – background vocals
 Jerry Douglas – slide guitar
 Glen Duncan – fiddle
 Stuart Duncan – mandolin, fiddle
 Pete Finney – steel guitar
 Paul Franklin – steel guitar
 Sonny Garrish – steel guitar
 Steve Gibson – acoustic guitar, electric guitar, mandolin
 Emory Gordy Jr. – bass guitar
 Owen Hale – drums
 Jimmy Hall – blues harp
 Tim Hensley – background vocals
 John Hobbs – piano
 John Barlow Jarvis – piano
 Mike Lawler – keyboards
 Patty Loveless – lead vocals
 Donna McElroy – background vocals
 Liana Manis – background vocals
 Carmella Ramsey – backgrounds vocals
 Dawn Sears – background vocals
 Harry Stinson – drums, background vocals
 Biff Watson – acoustic guitar
 Paul Worley – acoustic guitar
 Curtis Young – background vocals

Charts

References

1994 albums
Epic Records albums
Patty Loveless albums
Albums produced by Emory Gordy Jr.